No More Panic is name of the debut album by Singaporean singer Jocie Kok. The title track "No More Panic" is sung in the tune of Dragostea din Tei, by O-zone. Play Music won the rights to translate it in 2005. It was sung by Jocie Kok. The song tells about getting past fear and finding courage.

Track listing 
Songs on 2006 album 不怕不怕/No More Panic include:
 爱是你眼里的一首情歌 (Ai Shi Ni Yan Li De Yi Shou Qing Ge)
 大声说爱 (Da Sheng Shuo Ai)
 不怕不怕 (Bu Pa Bu Pa) - Fearless
 当你孤单你会想起谁 (Dang Ni Gu Dan Ni Hui Xiang Qi Shui)
 剪刀石头布 (Jian Dao Shi Tou Bu) - Rock, Paper, Scissors
 两难 (Liang Nan)
 勾勾手 (Gou Gou Shou)
 回家真好 (Hui Jia Zhen Hao) - Coming home is so Good
 我还是依然爱你 (Wo Hai Shi Yi Ran Ai Ni) - I still love you
 How Are You My Friend?
 不怕不怕 (Remix)
 老鼠爱大米 (Lao Shu Ai Da Mi) - The Mouse Loves the Rice

References

Jocie Kok albums
2006 albums